Huntington School is a coeducational, comprehensive secondary school situated in Huntington, York, England, with approximately 1,500 pupils.

History 
The school opened in September 1966 and became a comprehensive school in September 1973. The school's application to become a Specialist Technology college was granted in 1997.

Study

The arts 

The school holds the public 'Arts Festival' yearly in which music, art, drama, and dance exhibits are prepared and performed. The drama department hold separate plays and musicals during the course of the year, such as Blood Brothers. As well as this, a pantomime is put on every year for both students and the public by Sixth Formers and choral and musical concerts are held throughout the academic year too. Music groups at the school include Choir 21, Man Choir, and Secret Choir, composed of girls, boys, and Sixth Formers respectively. There are also instrumental groups such as Big Band, Little Band, and Saxophone, Woodwind, and String ensembles.

Sport 

Huntington School holds numerous sports clubs including but not limited to Badminton, Football, Hockey, Netball, Rugby, Running, Table Tennis, Tchoukball, and VX. As part of the Personal Development Programme (PDP) for Sixth Formers, students can complete a Sports Leadership Award and engage in sporting activities

Academic clubs 

The school hosts many academic societies, including Philosophy Hub, Debating, Amnesty, Faith Unfounded, Linguistics Club, and more. Many of these can be chosen as options for the PDP for Sixth Formers. Others are almost entirely student-run, with students running sessions on philosophical and ethical issues in Philosophy Hub for example.

International links 

The school has links with Missionsgymnasium St. Antonius in Bad Bentheim, Lower Saxony and conducts an annual work experience exchange for Sixth Formers. In the past, Huntington has also held exchanges with schools in Dijon, France.

Transport 
Due to its size, of approximately 1,500 students, the school operates a contracted bus system with York Pullman, which provides free transport (with a purchased pass, so technically not free) for some of the outlying villages in Huntington's catchment area, such as Strensall and Flaxton.

Notable former pupils 
 Journalist and Guardian columnist Oliver Burkeman
 Commentator Guy Mowbray
 Shed Seven members Rick Witter, Paul Banks and Tom Gladwin
 Actor Daniel Weyman
 Footballer Simon Heslop
 Author K. Sello Duiker

References

Educational institutions established in 1966
Secondary schools in York
1966 establishments in England
Community schools in York